Anaerolinea is a bacteria genus from the family of Anaerolineaceae.

References

Further reading
 
 

Chloroflexota
Bacteria genera